Water polo was contested for men only at the 1955 Pan American Games in Mexico City, Mexico.


Competing teams
Five teams contested the event.

Medalists

References
 
 
  .

1955
Events at the 1955 Pan American Games
Pan American Games
1955